The Wendell H. Ford Regional Training Center (WHFRTC) is a training ground located near Greenville in Muhlenberg County, Kentucky, and is the primary training center for the Kentucky National Guard.

The facility was dedicated on October 17, 1997. Prior to the establishment of WHFRTC, the majority of the land was managed by Peabody Coal Company.

As of September 16, 2017 the installation is commanded by Lieutenant Colonel Joe Lear, with Command Sergeant Major Keith Cox as the ranking enlisted soldier. The center serves as a training location for an average of 70,000 personnel per year.

Training programs

WHFRTC has a history of hosting a number of training programs for both military and civilian personnel, including:

 807th Medical Command, Best Warrior competition
 American Legion Kentucky Boys State Program
 Exportable Combat Training Capability Exercise (2005)
 Kentucky National Guard Officer Candidate School
 Kentucky National Guard Warrant Officer Candidate School
 Ordnance Group Team of the Year competition (2016)
 Kentucky Army National Guard Best Warrior competition

Additionally, WHFRTC is home to the National Responder Preparedness Center, a joint training mission with the Kentucky State Fire Commission, which opened in 2013. WHFRTC was also used as a regional support area during the August 2017 lunar eclipse.

Facilities 

 Barracks for almost 500
 Dining facility with seating for 400
 Computer simulated training facility
 Live fire weapons ranges
 Hardened bivouac sites
 Controlled humidity storage complex
 Obstacle course
 4,200 ft. grass runway
 Equipment maintenance facilities
 Drill hall

See also

 List of United States military bases
 National Guard of the United States
 United States Army Reserve

Notes

References

External links

 from Kentucky Educational Television

Military installations in Kentucky
1969 establishments in Kentucky
Muhlenberg County, Kentucky
Kentucky National Guard